ATP synthase F1 subunit epsilon, mitochondrial is an enzyme that in humans is encoded by the ATP5F1E gene. The protein encoded by ATP5F1E is a subunit of ATP synthase, also known as Complex V. Variations of this gene have been associated with mitochondrial complex V deficiency, nuclear 3 (MC5DN3) and Papillary Thyroid Cancer.

Function 

This gene encodes a subunit of mitochondrial ATP synthase. Mitochondrial ATP synthase catalyzes ATP synthesis, utilizing an electrochemical gradient of protons across the inner membrane during oxidative phosphorylation. ATP synthase is composed of two linked multi-subunit complexes: the soluble catalytic core, F1, and the membrane-spanning component, Fo, comprising the proton channel. The catalytic portion of mitochondrial ATP synthase consists of 5 different subunits (alpha, beta, gamma, delta, and epsilon) assembled with a stoichiometry of 3 alpha, 3 beta, and one each of gamma, delta and epsilon. The proton channel consists of three main subunits (a, b, c). This gene encodes the epsilon subunit of the catalytic core. Two pseudogenes of this gene are located on chromosomes 4 and 13.

Structure
The ATP5F1E gene, located on the q arm of chromosome 20 in position 13.32, is made up of 3 exons and is 3,690 base pairs in length. The ATP5F1E protein weighs 5.7 kDa and is composed of 51 amino acids. The protein is a subunit of the F1Fo ATPase, also known as Complex V, which consists of 14 nuclear and 2 mitochondrial -encoded subunits. The nomenclature of the enzyme has a long history. The F1 fraction derives its name from the term "Fraction 1" and Fo (written as a subscript letter "o", not "zero") derives its name from being the binding fraction for oligomycin, a type of naturally-derived antibiotic that is able to inhibit the Fo unit of ATP synthase. The F1 particle is large and can be seen in the transmission electron microscope by negative staining. These are particles of 9 nm diameter that pepper the inner mitochondrial membrane. They were originally called elementary particles and were thought to contain the entire respiratory apparatus of the mitochondrion, but, through a long series of experiments, Efraim Racker and his colleagues (who first isolated the F1 particle in 1961) were able to show that this particle is correlated with ATPase activity in uncoupled mitochondria and with the ATPase activity in submitochondrial particles created by exposing mitochondria to ultrasound. This ATPase activity was further associated with the creation of ATP by a long series of experiments in many laboratories.

Function 
Mitochondrial membrane ATP synthase (F1Fo ATP synthase or Complex V) produces ATP from ADP in the presence of a proton gradient across the membrane which is generated by electron transport complexes of the respiratory chain. F-type ATPases consist of two structural domains, F1 - containing the extramembraneous catalytic core, and Fo - containing the membrane proton channel, linked together by a central stalk and a peripheral stalk. During catalysis, ATP synthesis in the catalytic domain of F1 is coupled via a rotary mechanism of the central stalk subunits to proton translocation. Part of the complex F1 domain and of the central stalk which is part of the complex rotary element. Rotation of the central stalk against the surrounding alpha3beta3 subunits leads to hydrolysis of ATP in three separate catalytic sites on the beta subunits (By similarity).

The epsilon subunit is located in the stalk region of the F1 complex, and acts as an inhibitor of the ATPase catalytic core. The epsilon subunit can assume two conformations, contracted and extended, where the latter inhibits ATP hydrolysis. The conformation of the epsilon subunit is determined by the direction of rotation of the gamma subunit, and possibly by the presence of ADP. The epsilon subunit is thought to become extended in the presence of ADP, thereby acting as a safety lock to prevent wasteful ATP hydrolysis.

Clinical significance
Mutations in the ATP5F1E gene cause mitochondrial complex V deficiency, nuclear 3 (MC5DN3), a mitochondrial disorder with heterogeneous clinical manifestations including dysmorphic features, psychomotor retardation, hypotonia, growth retardation, cardiomyopathy, enlarged liver, hypoplastic kidneys and elevated lactate levels in urine, plasma and cerebrospinal fluid. Pathogenic variations have included a homozygous Tyr12Cys mutation in the ATP5E gene, which has been linked with neonatal onset complex V deficiency with lactic acidosis, 3-methylglutaconic aciduria, mild mental retardation and developed peripheral neuropathy.

Reduced expression of ATP5F1E is significantly associated with the diagnosis of Papillary Thyroid Cancer and may serve as an early tumor marker of the disease. Papillary Thyroid Cancer is the most common type of thyroid cancer, representing 75 percent to 85 percent of all thyroid cancer cases. It occurs more frequently in women and presents in the 20–55 year age group. It is also the predominant cancer type in children with thyroid cancer, and in patients with thyroid cancer who have had previous radiation to the head and neck.

Interactions 
ATP5F1E has been shown to have 34 binary protein-protein interactions including 28 co-complex interactions. ATP5F1E appears to interact with ATP5F1D, AGTRAP, CYP17A1, UBE2N.

References

Further reading

External links 
 

Enzymes